The women's K-4 500 metres canoeing event at the 2011 Pan American Games was held on October 26 at the Canoe & Rowing Course in Ciudad Guzman. The defending Pan American Games champion is Darisleydis Amador, Yulitza Meneses, Lianet Álvarez and Dayexi Gandarela of Cuba.

Schedule
All times are local Central Daylight Time (UTC−5)

Results

Final

References

Canoeing at the 2011 Pan American Games
Pan